The Navy Cross, post-nominal letters CN (Crux Navalis) is a military decoration which was instituted by the Republic of South Africa in 1987. It was awarded to members of the South African Navy for bravery. It was discontinued in 2003, but backdated awards can still be made for acts of bravery during this period.

The first award  was made by the then Chief of the Navy Vice Admiral Robert Simpson-Anderson on 15 August 1994.

The South African military
The Union Defence Forces (UDF) were established in 1912 and renamed the South African Defence Force (SADF) in 1958. On 27 April 1994, it was integrated with six other independent forces into the South African National Defence Force (SANDF).

Institution
The Navy Cross, post-nominal letters CN (Crux Navalis), was instituted by the State President in 1987.

Award criteria
The cross was initially awarded for exceptional ingenuity, resourcefulness and skill, and extraordinary leadership, dedication, sense of duty and personal example and courage in mortal danger in non-combatant situations. After 1993 it was awarded for exceptional courage, leadership, skill, ingenuity or tenacity in dangerous or critical situations. A Bar, instituted in 1993, could be awarded in recognition of further similar displays of courage, leadership, skill, ingenuity or tenacity in danger.

Order of wear

The position of the Navy Cross in the official order of precedence was revised three times, to accommodate the inclusion or institution of new decorations and medals, first upon the integration into the South African National Defence Force on 27 April 1994, again when decorations and medals were belatedly instituted in April 1996 for the two former non-statutory forces, the Azanian People's Liberation Army and Umkhonto we Sizwe, and again when a new series of military decorations and medals was instituted in South Africa on 27 April 2003, but it remained unchanged on all three occasions.

  
Official SANDF order of precedence
 Preceded by the Air Force Cross (CA) of the Republic of South Africa.
 Succeeded by the Medical Service Cross (CC) of the Republic of South Africa.

Official national order of precedence
 Preceded by the Air Force Cross (CA) of the Republic of South Africa.
 Succeeded by the Medical Service Cross (CC) of the Republic of South Africa.

Description
Obverse
The Navy Cross is a pointed cross, struck in silver, to fit in a circle 45 millimetres in diameter, with the South African Navy emblem in the centre on a navy blue roundel, 18 millimetres in diameter.

Reverse
The reverse has the pre-1994 South African Coat of Arms, with the decoration number impressed underneath.

Bar
The Bar was struck in silver and has a Protea emblem embossed in the centre. The same Bar was used to indicate multiple awards of the Pro Virtute Medal, Army Cross, Air Force Cross, Navy Cross, Medical Service Cross, Southern Cross Medal (1975) and Pro Merito Medal (1975).

Ribbon
The ribbon is 32 millimetres wide and white, with a 12 millimetres wide Navy blue centre band.

Discontinuation
Conferment of the decoration was discontinued in respect of services performed on or after 27 April 2003.

Recipients
Since inclusion in the table itself is impractical, the actions cited for follow below the table. The Ranks reflected are the final rank held by the recipient.

Actions cited for

References

Military decorations and medals of South Africa
Courage awards
1987 establishments in South Africa
Awards established in 1987